Pretty Beach is a south-eastern suburb of the Central Coast region of New South Wales, Australia on the Bouddi Peninsula. It is part of the  local government area.

The beach itself does not face the sea directly but is part of Brisbane Water, making it a safe place for both children and the mooring of boats. Pretty Beach is surrounded by the Bouddi National Park. The main institution in the area is the Pretty Beach Public school, established in 1928, which services the greater Bouddi Peninsula community. The school had a major overhaul between 2007 and 2009 and now is entirely new. 
In 2010 a new community pre-school was opened immediately behind the school.

In October 2006 a 'revamped' boat ramp with floating pontoon was opened to the public that allows small and mid-sized trailer-launched boats to access Brisbane Water and beyond.

The population of the suburb recorded at the 2016 census was 352; an increase from the 249 recorded in 2006.

References

Suburbs of the Central Coast (New South Wales)